Chehel Tokhm (also known as Chehel Tokhm-e Bam, Chil Tūkh, Seyyedābād, and Zeydābād Chehel Tokhm) is a village in Kork and Nartich Rural District, in the Central District of Bam County, Kerman Province, Iran. As of the 2006 census, the population was 542 individuals, making up 143 families.

References 

Populated places in Bam County